Yellow Lantern or variants may refer to:

Botany
Banksia lemanniana, a shrub known as Yellow Lantern Banksia
Capsicum chinense, a chili pepper known as Yellow Lantern Chili
Hainan yellow lantern chili, an unrelated chili

Comics
Yellow Lantern, the Bizarro World version of Green Lantern in DC Comics
Sinestro Corps, a DC Comics organization also known as Yellow Lantern Corps